Annette Solmell (born 1 July 1959) is a Swedish equestrian. She competed in two events at the 1996 Summer Olympics.

References

External links
 

1959 births
Living people
Swedish dressage riders
Swedish female equestrians
Olympic equestrians of Sweden
Equestrians at the 1996 Summer Olympics
Sportspeople from Norrköping